805th Pioneer Infantry was an all-African American infantry regiment of the United States Army during World War I. The 805th contained black soldiers from the state of Mississippi. The regiment landed in France in July 1918 and served in Europe until July 1919; the division saw 39 days of action.

Entertainment and sports 
During World War I, the regiment was nicknamed the "Bear Cats." A commander, Colonel Chauncey Benton Humphrey (1872–1958) (USMA 1898), boasted that, among other things, his Bear Cats had "the best Jazz band in France," "the best vaudeville show in the American Expeditionary Forces, and the best baseball team of any outfit in France."

Notable personnel 
 Moses Hardy (1894–2006), Supercentenarian, served in the 805th during World War I
 Billy Higgins (1888–1937), vaudeville comedian, songwriter served in the 805th during World War I, rising to the rank of Color Sergeant

See also 
Other segregated, non-white units in the U.S. Armed Forces
 92nd Infantry Division
 366th Infantry Regiment

 93rd Infantry Division
 185th Brigade (Infantry)
 369th Infantry Regiment (Harlem Hellfighters)
 370th Infantry Regiment (The Black Devils)
 186th Brigade (Infantry)
 371st Infantry Regiment
 372nd Infantry Regiment
 Other
 758th Tank Battalion
 442nd Infantry Regiment
 332nd Fighter Group (Tuskegee Airmen)

Related articles
 Racial segregation in the United States Armed Forces
 Desegregation in the United States Marine Corps
 Hispanics in the United States Marine Corps
 Military history of African Americans 
 Montford Point Marine Association
 United States Colored Troops

References 

Military units and formations in Mississippi
African-American history of the United States military
United States Army regiments of World War I